Lewes bus station is a bus station in Lewes, England. It opened on 26 March 1954 as a terminus for Southdown Motor Services routes. The adjacent bus depot was opened several months earlier.

The bus station was sold by Stagecoach in 2006 and is currently owned by the Generator Group.

In August 2021, plans were submitted for the demolition of the bus station and redevelopment of the site.

The Twentieth Century Society submitted an application to Historic England to list the building however the Generator Group has also submitted a request for the building to not be listed. It closed on 16 September 2022.

Design
The building has two storeys with the upper floor larger than the lower floor, creating an overhang which provides shelter.

References

External links

Bus stations in England
Lewes
Transport infrastructure completed in 1954
1954 establishments in England
2022 disestablishments in England